Fischeripollis is a genus of extinct plants in the family Droseraceae. Several species have been formally described and another has been temporarily designated Fischeripollis sp. A.

F. halensis was described based on fossilised pollen from sediments in the Hale Basin of central Australia, dated to the middle-late Eocene. F. krutschei was discovered in Saxony, Germany. F. undulatus was also native to Europe.

References

External links
Fischeripollis sp. A pollen
Fischeripollis sp. A pollen

Droseraceae
Extinct carnivorous plants
Prehistoric angiosperm genera
Eocene plants